Mone (born Hsu Nandar Aung on 27 October 1992) is a Burmese television and film actress. She is best known for her role in television series Shwe Kyar Phoo Thit (2018), Toxic (2018), A Lin Htae Ka Lu (2019) and Late Pyar Hnaung Kyo (2019).

Early life and education
Mone was born on 27 October 1992 in Yangon, Myanmar. She attended high school at BEHS 1 Hlaing. She attended with majoring in history at University of Distance Education, Yangon.

Career
In 2012, she started her career form competing in Yatha Paw Lwin Tha Yote Saung Lwin Pyin.
After competing it, MRTV-4 talent was selected for the new cast. In 2013, she starred in comedy series Happy Beach alongside Kyi Zaw Htet, Kyaw Hsu, Min Tharke, Khay Sett Thwin, Wint Yamone Naing, Myat Thu Thu and Zu Zu Zan. In 2014, she co-starred in drama series Forever Mandalay  alongside Aung Min Khant, Chue Lay, Aung Yay Chan, Nat Khat and Ju Jue Kay. In 2016, she starred in drama series Ma Ma Htake and Heritage House alongside Khine Thin Kyi, Hein Htet, Poe Kyar Phyu Khin and Su Waddy.

In 2018, she starred in drama series Shwe Kyar Phoo Thit. In 2019, she starred in action-drama series A Lin Htae Ka Lu alongside Si Phyo and Ju Jue Kay. The same year, she starred in thriller series Toxic alongside Moht Moht Myint Aung, Min Oo, Kyaw Hsu, Mya Hnin Yee Lwin and Thi Ha. The same year, she starred in horror-drama series Late Pyar Hnaung Kyo alongside Hein Htet (actor), May Mi Ko Ko and Thi Ha.

Filmography

Film
Mhone (2014)

Film (cinema)
Baw Baw Ka Htaw (2018)
Hit Tine (2019)
Lady Danger (2020)
Myet Nu (2020)

Television series
Happy Beach (2013)
Forever Mandalay (2014)
Ma Ma Htake and Heritage House (2016)
Shwe Kyar Phoo Thit (2018)
Toxic (2018)
A Lin Htae Ka Lu (2019)
Late Pyar Hnaung Kyo (2019)
Say Ta Lone Maung Phone (2021)

References

External links

Living people
1992 births
21st-century Burmese actresses
People from Yangon